Metochus abbreviatus is a species of dirt-colored seed bug in the family Rhyparochromidae, found in eastern and Southeast Asia.

References

External links

 

Rhyparochromidae